The Madrid city of Parla has a circular tram line which provides transportation within the city as well as to the rest of the metropolitan area. This network is standard gauge which facilitates compatibility and vehicle interchangeability with other lines built or planned in the Community of Madrid. The main shareholder of the company is Globalvia (a Spanish private infrastructure company) with 85%, and then CCM with 15%.

The tram is integrated in the Metro Ligero system as ML Line 4.

Project 
This is a project promoted by the local administration of Parla. Opened on 6 May 2007 (Phase I), and 8 September 2007 (Phase II), can be the journey between the stations Plaza de Toros to Parla Industrial City until completion of the works of the station North Parla (which is still to be opened and will house a railway interchange with Cercanías Madrid).

It consists of a circular line of 15 stations with stops every 500 meters, a total length of 8.3 km (similar to the Montpellier tramway). It connects the city center with new urban developments (Parla Este among them) and points of interest in the city such as the Commissioner of Police, health and cultural centers, shopping centers, etc. There is a connection with the Parla station of Cercanías Madrid located in downtown Parla and in future with a new station in the north of the city.
Along with the construction of the tram, there have been "park and ride" facilities built throughout the city to promote the use of public transport.

Extensions 
There were planned to eventually build two more lines, also circular.
"Line 2" would run to PAU-5, located on the banks of the A-42, to aid in the development of the Parla industrial park.
"Line 3" would serve the future developments of southern Parla and the hospital and the new commuter train station to be located in the south of the city.

However, given the financial crisis facing the city there are many questions about the economic feasibility of extending the system. So far as January 2020, Parla Tram remains with their single line.

Ticketing 
 
The ticket price is similar to urban bus lines in the city. Madrid regional travel passes are valid (at least B2 zone).

Capacity 
Parla Tram uses the Alstom Citadis 302, with a maximum capacity of 220 passengers, being the same amount as three buses. This model is the same used in Trambaix and Trambesòs in Barcelona, Tenerife Tram, Murcia Tram and Metro Ligero de Madrid.

Criticism 

During the first year of operation the tram recorded 2,350,000 passengers and 3,800,000 passengers in the second, coming in 2011 to 5,000,000 passengers, with a weekday average utilization of nearly 20,000 passengers. The satisfaction rate in the survey conducted in 2012 was an 8.64 out of 10.

The project has been criticized, because Parla remains a dormitory community of Madrid, and most workers commute to work in neighboring towns due to the small industrial base offered by the city, so improved external connections are critical. Also the current alignment does not connect to key parts of the city such as La Laguna or the South Hospital, these neighborhoods would be connected through future line extensions.

Advocates argue that, thanks to the tram, all of Parla is connected to the trains that provide transit to the capital and to allow greater ease in internal displacement that encourages trade, industry and urban tertiary consolidation.

Critics assert that Parla does not have the critical mass of citizens to justify a streetcar system, stating that it instead could have solved mobility needs with other means of transport like the bus. Its proponents argue that the huge demand that occurs during rush hour, with figures in the environment of the 2,000 passengers an hour, they need a way to transport larger capacity than the bus but less than that a suburban railway line would have.

See also 
Light rail
Transportation in Spain

References

External links 
Official Website

Tram transport in Spain
Parla
Standard gauge railways in Spain
Parla